Joseph Anthony Cox (born March 31, 1958) is an American actor known for his roles in Bad Santa,  Friday, Me, Myself & Irene, Date Movie, Epic Movie, Disaster Movie, and Leprechaun 2. He is also known for his role in George Lucas's Willow, as an Ewok in Return of the Jedi and as The Preacher in Tim Burton's Beetlejuice. Cox also appeared in various music videos.

Early life
Cox was born in Uniontown, Alabama, the son of Henrietta Cox-Penn and Joe Cox. He spent his childhood in Uniontown, with his grandmother and grandfather, Lottie and Henry Jones. His mother and stepfather, Rudolph (Rudy) Penn, live in College Park, Georgia. By the age of 10 he became an avid drummer. He met his future wife, Otelia, during high school. They were eventually married in 1981 when Cox was 23 years old.

After graduation from high school, Cox attended the Alabama State University and originally planned to study music. Cox said in a 2003 interview with Jet magazine, "I played by ear. It was exactly like in Drumline. I played against some of the drummers from the school, and they didn't have anything on me. I just couldn't read music."

Career
Shortly thereafter, Cox decided to pursue acting after watching Billy Barty, a little person who was an actor and also founder of the organization Little People of America.  Encouraged by relatives and friends, he moved to Los Angeles at age 18.  He began taking classes at the Merrick Studio School of Acting with Scriptwriter De De Tillman and soon began working in commercials, film, and television roles. He is better known for his roles in Bad Santa where he played Marcus, the brains of a safe cracking duo, and in Date Movie where he played a parody of Dr. Hitch from Hitch. As second lead to Billy Bob Thornton, Cox's role in Bad Santa was a rare occurrence of a little person actor in a leading role. Cox reprised his role as Marcus in Bad Santa 2, released in 2016.

Cox also appeared on the TV show Martin in the first season, playing the character Bennie, in which he helps his friend Trey, played by Bushwick Bill, beat up Tommy played by Thomas Mikal Ford, over Tommy allegedly "stealing" his ex-girlfriend.

Cox also appeared in a pivotal role in the Farrelly Brothers' movie Me, Myself & Irene, playing a Mensa International-member limousine driver who steals Jim Carrey's character's wife.

Filmography

Film

Television

Video games

Music videos

References

External links

1958 births
Male actors from Alabama
People from Uniontown, Alabama
Actors with dwarfism
African-American male actors
American male film actors
American male television actors
20th-century American male actors
21st-century American male actors
Living people
20th-century African-American people
21st-century African-American people